Nico is a unisex given name. It is a short form of Nicholas, Nicolas, Nicola, Nicole, Dominic and others. In Italian it may also be short for Domenico, Nicolò and for Nicodemo. Notable people with the name include:

Nico (1938–1988), born Christa Päffgen, singer with The Velvet Underground
Nico (Romanian singer) (born 1970)
Nico Aaltonen (born 1988), Finnish ice hockey player
Nico Abegglen (born 1990), Swiss footballer
Nico Antonitsch (born 1991), Austrian footballer
Nico Archambault (born 1984), Canadian dancer and choreographer
Nico Assumpção (1954–2001), Brazilian bass player
Nico Baleani (born 1992), Spanish footballer
Nico Baracchi (1957–2015), Swiss bobsledder 
Nico Berg (born 1973), Canadian soccer player
Nico Bettge (born 1980), German slalom canoeist 
Nico Beyer (born 1964), German film director and producer
Nico Binst (born 1992), Belgian footballer
Nicolaas Bloembergen (1920–2017), Dutch and American physicist and Nobel laureate
Nico Bodonczy (born 1955), Chilean-American soccer player
Nico Boje (born 1973), South African cricketer
Nico H.J. van den Boogaard (1938–1982), Dutch medievalist scholar
Nico Bouvy (1892–1957), Dutch footballer
Nico Braun (born 1950), Luxembourgian footballer
Nico de Bree (1944–2016), Dutch football goalkeeper
Nico van Breemen (born 1942), Dutch soil scientist
Nico Broekhuysen (1876–1958), Dutch teacher and inventor of korfball
Nico Brüngger (born 1988), Swiss cyclist
Nico Burchert (born 1987), German footballer
Nico Buwalda (1890–1970), Dutch footballer
Nico Carstens (1926–2016), South African accordionist and songwriter
Nico Casavecchia (born 1961), Argentine director
Nico Castel (1931–2015), Multinational operatic tenor
Nico Claesen (born 1962), Belgian footballer
Nico Colaluca (born 1986), American soccer player
Nico Collard (born 1970s), American music director, producer, and guitarist
Nico Collins (born 1999), American football player
Nico Covatti (born 1988), Argentine motorcycle speedway rider 
Nico Däbritz (born 1971), German footballer
Nico de Boinville (born 1989), English jockey
Nico F. Declercq (born 1975), Belgian physicist and mechanical engineer
Nico Delle Karth (born 1984), Austrian sailor
Nico Denz (born 1994), German cyclist
Nico Dewalque (born 1945), Belgian footballer
Nico Diederichs (1903–1978), South African State President
Nico Dijkshoorn (born 1960), Dutch author, columnist, and musician
Nico Dostal (1895–1981), Austrian operetta and film music composer
Nico Eekman (1889–1973), Belgian figurative painter
Nico Elorde (born 1991), Filipino  basketball player
Nico Elvedi (born 1996), Swiss footballer
Nico Emonds (born 1961), Belgian cyclist
Nico Empen (born 1996), German footballer
Nico Esterhuyse (born 1984), Namibian rugby player
Nico Evers-Swindell (born 1979), New Zealand actor
Nico Falah (born 1995), American football player
Nico Fidenco (born 1933), Italian singer
Nico Freriks (born 1981), Dutch volleyball player
Nico Frijda (1927–2015), Dutch psychologist
Nico Frommer (born 1978), German footballer
Nico Frutos (born 1981), Argentine footballer
Nico van Gageldonk (1913–1995), Dutch cyclist
Nico Gaitán (born 1988), Argentine footballer
Nico Gardener (1906–1989), British bridge player
Nico González (footballer, born 1988), Spanish footballer
Nico Gorzel (born 1998), German footballer
Nico Granatowski (born 1991), German footballer
Nico Gunzburg (1882–1984), Belgian lawyer and criminologist
Nico Gutjahr (born 1993), German footballer
Nico de Haas (1907–1995), Dutch photographer and currency designer
Nico Habermann (1932–1993), Dutch computer scientist
Nico Hambro (1861–1926), Norwegian female politician (Nicoline)
Nico Hammann (born 1988), German footballer
Nico Hischier (born 1999), Swiss ice hockey player
Nico Hülkenberg (born 1987), German Formula One driver 
Nico Jalink (born 1964), Dutch football player
Nico Kasanda (1939–1985), Congo guitarist and composer
Nico Landeweerd (born 1954), Dutch water polo player
Nico Mannion (born 2001), Italian-American basketball player
Nico Mbarga (1950–1997), Nigerian musician
Nico Mirallegro (born 1991), British actor 
Nico Motchebon (born 1969), German runner
Nico Muhly (born 1981), American contemporary classical composer
Nico Naldini (born 1929), Italian novelist, poet, and film director
Nico Nyberg (born 1993), Finnish ice hockey player
Nico Onkenhout (1918–1989), Dutch sculptor
Nico Pulzetti (born 1984), Italian footballer
Nico Pepe (1917–1987), Italian film actor
Nico Perrone (born 1935), Italian journalist
Nico Rosberg (born 1985), German-Finnish former Formula One driver and 2016 Formula One World Champion
Nico Schulz (born 1993), German footballer
Nico Siragusa (born 1994), American football player
Nico Tortorella (born 1988), American actor
Nico Vaesen (born 1969), Belgian footballer
Nico Vascellari (born 1976) Italian artist and musician
Nico Verhoeven (born 1961), Dutch cyclist

Nicknames
Klaus Peter Cadsky (1937–2011), Swiss cartoonist
Antonio Mariño Souto (born 1935), Cuban painter, known as Ñico

Fictional characters
Nico Blake, female character from the British soap opera Hollyoaks
Nico Collard, a main character in the Broken Sword series
Nico di Angelo, a son of Hades in the Percy Jackson and the Olympians and the Heroes of Olympus series by Rick Riordan 
Nico von Lahnstein, female character from the German soap opera Verbotene Liebe
Nico Minoru, a comic character who briefly went by the moniker "Sister Grimm" in Runaways
Nico Reilly, a lead character in the TV series Lipstick Jungle
Nico Robin, a manga character from One Piece
Nico Slater, a character in the TV series Ugly Betty
Nico Toscani, character in Above the Law
Nico Kanna, a character of Puella Magi Kazumi Magica, a spinoff manga of Puella Magi Madoka Magica.
Nico Yazawa, a character in the mixed media project Love Live! School Idol Project
Nico, a yellow canary in the film Rio and its sequel Rio 2

See also

Niko (disambiguation)
Niño (name)
Nino (name)

Dutch masculine given names
German masculine given names
Italian masculine given names